The Golden Globe Award for Best Television Series – Musical or Comedy is one of the annual Golden Globe Awards, given to the best comedy television series. From 1962 to 1968, the category was Golden Globe Award for Best Television Series, and grouped Musical, Comedy and Drama series in a single category (see Golden Globe Award for Best Television Series – Drama).

1960s

1970s

1980s

1990s

2000s

2010s

2020s

Series with multiple wins

4 wins
 All in the Family

3 wins
 The Golden Girls
 Sex and the City
 Taxi

2 wins
 Ally McBeal
 Barney Miller
 The Carol Burnett Show
 Desperate Housewives
 Fame
 Glee

Series with multiple nominations

10 nominations
 The Carol Burnett Show
 Cheers

8 nominations
 Frasier

7 nominations
 All in the Family
 The Golden Girls
 Will & Grace

6 nominations
 Entourage
 M*A*S*H
 Sex and the City
 Taxi

5 nominations
 Ally McBeal
 Friends
 The Mary Tyler Moore Show
 Modern Family
 Murphy Brown
 Seinfeld

4 nominations
 30 Rock
 The Love Boat

3 nominations
 Alice
 Barney Miller
 The Big Bang Theory
 The Cosby Show
 Desperate Housewives
 Fame
 Family Ties
 Girls
 Glee
 Mad About You
 The Marvelous Mrs. Maisel
 Moonlighting
 The Office
 Roseanne
 Rowan & Martin's Laugh-In
 Spin City
 Transparent
 Weeds

2 nominations
 3rd Rock from the Sun
 Arrested Development
 Barry
 Black-ish
 Brooklyn Bridge
 Californication
 Curb Your Enthusiasm
 Designing Women
 Dharma & Greg
 Episodes
 Evening Shade
 The Glen Campbell Goodtime Hour
 The Great
 Hacks
 Happy Days
 Home Improvement
 Kate & Allie
 The Kominsky Method
 Laverne & Shirley
 Maude
 Mozart in the Jungle
 Only Murders in the Building
 Orange Is the New Black
 The Partridge Family
 Silicon Valley
 The Sonny & Cher Comedy Hour
 Ted Lasso
 Veep
 The Wonder Years

Total awards by network

 NBC – 17
 CBS – 13
 ABC – 11

 HBO – 6
 Fox – 5
 Amazon Prime Video – 4
 
 BBC – 1
 FX – 1
 HBO Max – 1

 Netflix - 1
 Pop TV - 1
 Syndicated – 1

See also
 Primetime Emmy Award for Outstanding Comedy Series
 Screen Actors Guild Award for Outstanding Performance by an Ensemble in a Comedy Series
 Critics' Choice Television Award for Best Comedy Series

External links
 IMDB Golden Globes

Television Series Musical or Comedy